The boreal owl or Tengmalm's owl (Aegolius funereus) is a small owl in the "true owl" family Strigidae. It is known as the boreal owl in North America and as Tengmalm's owl in Europe after Swedish naturalist Peter Gustaf Tengmalm or, more rarely, Richardson's owl after Sir John Richardson.

Due to the boreal owl's shyness and evasive reaction to human activities, nocturnal habits and preferred inaccessible taiga forest habitat, it is rarely seen by humans.

Taxonomy
The boreal owl was formally described by the Swedish naturalist Carl Linnaeus in 1758 in the tenth edition of his Systema Naturae. Linnaeus placed it with all the other owls in the genus Strix and coined the binomial name Strix funerea. The Eurasian scops owl is now placed in the genus Aegolius that was introduced in 1829 by the German naturalist Johann Jakob Kaup with the boreal owl as the type species. The genus name is Latin for a screech owl, the word came from the Ancient Greek aigōlios meaning "a bird of ill omen". The specific epithet funereus is Latin meaning "funereal".

Seven subspecies are recognised: 
A.f funereus (Linnaeus, 1758) – nominate subspecies, from Scandinavia down south to the Pyrenees and east to the Urals, but not the Caucasus Mountains
A.f. magnus (Buturlin, 1907) – northeast Siberia
A.f. sibiricus (Buturlin, 1910) – southeast and south Siberia
A.f. pallens (Schalow, 1908) – west and central Siberia
A.f. caucasicus (Buturlin, 1907) – Caucasus Mountains
A.f. beickianus Stresemann, 1928 – northwest India to southwest China

Description

The plumage is brown above, with white flecking on the shoulders and whitish underparts with rust-colored streaks. The head is large with yellow eyes and a dull white facial disc that is sometimes described as giving the owl a "surprised" expression. The beak is a light yellow, rather than dark like its relative the northern saw-whet owl. The sexes are similar in appearance. The plumage of young birds is chocolate brown. The boreal owl's flight is relatively noiseless and straight.

Its call is similar in sound to the "winnowing" of the North American Wilson's snipe.

Distribution and habitat
The boreal owl breeds in dense coniferous forests across northern North America and the Palearctic, and in mountain ranges such as the Alps and the Rockies. This species is not normally migratory, but in some autumns significant numbers move further south. It is rarely any great distance south of its breeding range, although this is partly due to the problems of detecting this nocturnal owl outside the breeding season when it is not calling.

Behaviour

Breeding

They first breed when one year of age. The nest is usually a hole in a tree often that made by a woodpecker, but the birds also readily use nest-boxes. The clutch is usually 3–7 eggs which are laid at 2-day intervals. The eggs are incubated only by the female beginning with the second egg. They hatch asynchronously after 25–32 days. The young are cared for by the female who broods the nestlings for an average of 21 days. The young fledge when aged around 28–33 days and become independent at 5 to 6 weeks.

Food and feeding
This small owl eats mainly voles and other mammals (such as mice, chipmunks, other squirrels, gophers, moles, shrews and bats), but also birds as well as small amphibians, insects (such as beetles) and other invertebrates. In North America, they have been observed preying on southern red-backed voles, western heather voles, jumping mice, northern pocket gophers and northern flying squirrels. Birds preyed upon include dark-eyed juncos, American robins and common redpolls. It is largely nocturnal, though in the northernmost parts of its range, it has to hunt during daylight because of the very short nights in summer.

Mortality
Banded boreal owls have been known to live up to 16 years. Due to the owl's small stature it is often eaten by other owls and large raptors thus decreasing its average lifespan.

References

Sources

External links

 
 
 
 
 

boreal owl
Holarctic birds
boreal owl
boreal owl